The Qatar Classic is an annual international squash tournament that takes place in Doha, Qatar in October or November. The event was re-established in 2001. Between 1992 and 1997, the tournament was formerly known as the Qatar International. The tournament features both men and women, the men's event is part of the PSA World Series and the women's event is part of the WSA World Series.

Past Results

Men's

Women's

References

External links
qatarsquash.com/championship.htm - Official website
Qatar Classic on squashsite.co.uk

Squash tournaments in Qatar
Recurring sporting events established in 2001